Martins Fork Lake is a  reservoir in Harlan County, Kentucky. The lake was impounded from the Martins Fork in 1979 by the United States Army Corps of Engineers. It is named for James Martin, an early pioneer in the area.

References

External links
U.S. Army Corps of Engineers – Martins Fork Lake

1979 establishments in Kentucky
Protected areas of Harlan County, Kentucky
Reservoirs in Kentucky
Buildings and structures in Harlan County, Kentucky
Bodies of water of Harlan County, Kentucky